Looney Tunes Golden Collection: Volume 1 is a DVD box set that was released by Warner Home Video on October 28, 2003. The first release of the Looney Tunes Golden Collection DVD series, it contains 56 Looney Tunes and Merrie Melodies cartoons and numerous supplements. The set won the Classic Award at the Parents' Choice Awards.

Related releases
In Regions 2 and 4, the discs were packaged as follows:
 Disc 1: Best of Bugs Bunny
 Disc 2: Best of Daffy and Porky
 Disc 3 (Region 2): All Stars - Volume 1
 Disc 4 (Region 2): All Stars - Volume 2
 Discs 3 and 4 (Region 4): All Stars - Volumes 1 and 2

In Region 1, discs 3 and 4 were also released separately as the more family-friendly Looney Tunes Premiere Collection (also known as Looney Tunes Spotlight Collection: Volume 1).

Disc 1 - Best of Bugs Bunny
All cartoons on this disc star Bugs Bunny.

Special features

Audio bonuses
 Music-only audio tracks on Rabbit Seasoning, What's Up Doc?, Rabbit's Kin
 Audio commentaries
 Michael Barrier on "Rabbit Seasoning", "Long-Haired Hare", "Bully for Bugs", Big Top Bunny, Wabbit Twouble
 Greg Ford on High Diving Hare", "What's Up Doc?
 Stan Freberg on Rabbit's Kin

From the Vaults
 Bonus cartoon: (Blooper) Bunny (Bugs Bunny, Daffy Duck, Elmer Fudd, Yosemite Sam; 1997)- with optional commentary by Greg Ford
 Bugs Bunny at the Movies Excerpts: My Dream Is Yours, Two Guys From Texas
 The Bugs Bunny Show: A Star is Bored bridging sequences; The Astro-Nuts audio recording sessions with Mel Blanc
 Trailer gallery: Bugs Bunny's Cartoon Festival, Bugs Bunny's Cartoon Jamboree
 Stills gallery

Behind-the-Tunes
 Bugs: A Rabbit For All Seasonings: A look at Warner Bros. (and Looney Tunes) most popular wascally wabbit, Bugs Bunny.
 Short-Fuse Shootout: The Small Tale of Yosemite Sam: A look at Yosemite Sam, the fiery redheaded cowboy character that served as one of Bugs' many adversaries.
 Forever Befuddled: A look at Elmer Fudd, the naive (and often neurotic) everyman and hunter who also was one of Bugs' many adversaries.

Others
 A greeting from Chuck Jones
 Camera Three: The Boys From Termite Terrace: Part 1

Disc 2 - Best of Daffy & Porky

Special features

Audio bonuses
 Music-only audio tracks on Duck Amuck, Drip-Along Daffy, The Scarlet Pumpernickel, Rabbit Fire
 Audio commentaries by Michael Barrier on Duck Amuck, Drip-Along Daffy, The Scarlet Pumpernickel, The Wearing of the Grin, Duck Dodgers in the 24½th Century

Behind-the-Tunes
 Hard Luck Duck
 Porky Pig Roast: A Tribute to the World's Most Famous Ham
 Animal Quackers

Others
 Camera Three: The Boys From Termite Terrace: Part 2
 Stills gallery

Disc 3 - Looney Tunes All-Stars: Part 1
Cartoons 1-12 are directed by Chuck Jones (10 co-directed by Abe Levitow), 13 and 14 by Bob Clampett.

Special features

Audio bonuses
 Music-only audio tracks on Baton Bunny, Feed the Kitty
 Audio commentaries
 Stan Freberg on Bugs Bunny and the Three Bears
 Michael Barrier on Fast and Furry-ous, Haredevil Hare, For Scent-imental Reasons, Bugs Bunny Gets the Boid
 Michael Barrier and Greg Ford on Hair-Raising Hare
 Greg Ford on Feed the Kitty

From the Vaults
 Toon Heads: The Lost Cartoons
 Hair-Raising Hare and The Hypo-Chondri-Cat schematics
 Stills gallery

Behind-the-Tunes
 Too Fast, Too Furry-ous: A look at the creation of the Road Runner and Wile E. Coyote cartoons, Chuck Jones' famous chase cartoon series.
 Merrie Melodies: Carl Stalling and Cartoon Music: A look at Carl Stalling and how he composed music for the Looney Tunes/Merrie Melodie cartoons.
 Blanc Expressions: A look at voice actor, Jerome Melvin "Mel" Blanc (colloquially known as "The Man of 1000 Voices") and how he voiced the Looney Tunes characters.

Disc 4 - Looney Tunes All-Stars: Part 2
Cartoons 1-9 are directed by Friz Freleng, 10–14 by Robert McKimson.

Special features

Audio bonuses
 Music-only audio tracks on Putty Tat Trouble, Speedy Gonzales, A Broken Leghorn
 Audio commentaries
 Jerry Beck on Canary Row, Canned Feud, Speedy Gonzales, and Devil May Hare
 Michael Barrier on Tweety's S.O.S. and The Foghorn Leghorn

From the Vaults
 Bosko, the Talk-Ink Kid
 Virgil Ross pencil tests
 Stills gallery

Behind-the-Tunes
 Needy For Speedy: A look at Speedy Gonzales, Robert McKimson's heroic Mexican mouse who tricked gringo pussycats (and later, Daffy Duck) to help get cheese for his starving friends.
 Putty Problems and Canary Rows: A look at how Sylvester and Tweety were created and how their pairing led to some of the most memorable cartoons in Warner Bros. history.
 Southern Pride Chicken: A look at Foghorn Leghorn, the loud-mouthed, trickster rooster loosely based on Fred Allen's Senator Claghorn character.

Others
 Irreverent Imagination: The Golden Age of Looney Tunes (documentary)

Reception
In their review of the set, the Parents' Choice Foundation, at their Parents' Choice Award site, awarded the release the "Classic Award" for its high quality in presenting classic material. While cautioning parents about some of the cartoon violence, the review called the set, "solid gold, not just because of the brilliant animated shorts but because of the plethora of commentaries, historical documentaries on the minds behind the madness," and "a true treasure of imagination worth having in your DVD library."

The DVD site, The Digital Bits claimed that Looney Tunes had been one of the most anticipated releases since the inception of the DVD format, and noted that the wait had been "long, but in the end definitely worthwhile." The site's reviewer wrote that the cartoon shorts on the DVDs looked, "brighter, much more colourful, cleaner, sharper, and generally better-framed than their Laserdisc  counterparts," which, until that time, had been the best home-format for viewing the cartoons. The reviewer noted that the "very generous selection of supplements" were "almost uniformly informative and entertaining."

The multimedia news and reviews website, IGN complained about the selection of shorts offered on the first set in the Looney Tunes Golden Collection series. First pointing out that it would be impossible not to leave out major cartoons by selecting only 56 out of the 1,100 Looney Tunes, the review criticized the selection for the omission of Knighty Knight Bugs, an Academy Award-winning 1958 Bugs Bunny cartoon. IGN complimented the restoration of the shorts, but noted that dust was visible in some cases. The reviewer noted that there were more extras than cartoons on the set, and singled out the audio commentaries for praise due to their variety.

References

External links

See also
 Looney Tunes Golden Collection
 Looney Tunes and Merrie Melodies filmography
 Looney Tunes and Merrie Melodies filmography (1929–1939)
 Looney Tunes and Merrie Melodies filmography (1940–1949)
 Looney Tunes and Merrie Melodies filmography (1950–1959)
 Looney Tunes and Merrie Melodies filmography (1960–1969)
 Looney Tunes and Merrie Melodies filmography (1970–present and miscellaneous)

Looney Tunes home video releases
Films scored by Carl Stalling